They Live is a 1988 American science fiction action horror film written and directed by John Carpenter, based on the 1963 short story "Eight O'Clock in the Morning" by Ray Nelson. Starring Roddy Piper, Keith David, and Meg Foster, the film follows an unnamed drifter who discovers through special sunglasses that the ruling class are aliens concealing their appearance and manipulating people to consume, breed, and conform to the status quo via subliminal messages in mass media.

Having acquired the film rights to the Nelson-penned short story prior to the production of They Live, Carpenter used the story as the basis for the screenplay's structure, which he wrote under the pseudonym "Frank Armitage". Carpenter has stated that the themes of They Live stemmed from his dissatisfaction with the economic policies of then-U.S. President Ronald Reagan, as well as what Carpenter saw as increasing commercialization in both popular culture and politics.

They Live was a minor success upon release, debuting at #1 at the North American box office. It initially received negative reviews from critics, who lambasted its social commentary, writing, and acting; however, it later gained a cult following and experienced a significantly more favorable critical reception. It is now regarded by many as one of Carpenter’s best films. The film has also entered the pop culture lexicon, notably having a lasting effect on street art (particularly that of Shepard Fairey). A nearly six-minute sequence in which the protagonists brawl in an alley has made appearances on all-time lists for best fight scenes.

Plot
A homeless drifter—credited as "Nada"—comes to Los Angeles in search of a job. While out on the street, he sees a street preacher warning that "they" have recruited the rich and powerful to control humanity. Nada finds employment at a construction site and is befriended by coworker Frank, who invites him to live in a shanty town soup kitchen led by a man named Gilbert.

That night, a hacker takes over television broadcasts, claiming that scientists have discovered signals that are enslaving the population and keeping them in a dream-like state, and that the only way to stop it is to shut off the signal at its source. Those watching the broadcast complain of headaches. Nada secretly follows Gilbert and the preacher into a nearby church and discovers them meeting with a group that includes the hacker. He sees scientific equipment and cardboard boxes inside. Nada is discovered by the blind preacher and escapes.

The shantytown and church are both destroyed in a police raid in the same night, and the hacker and preacher are beaten by riot police. The following day, Nada retrieves one of the boxes from the church and takes a pair of sunglasses from it, hiding the rest in a trash can. Nada discovers that the sunglasses make the world appear monochrome, but also reveal subliminal messages in the media to consume, reproduce, and conform. The glasses also reveal that many people are actually aliens with skull-like faces.

When Nada mocks an alien woman at a supermarket, she alerts other aliens via a wristwatch-like device. Nada leaves but is confronted by two alien police officers. He kills them and steals their weapons. Nada enters a bank, where he sees that several of the employees and customers are aliens. He kills several aliens with a shotgun and escapes by taking Cable 54 employee Holly Thompson hostage. At Holly's home, Nada tries to get her to try on the glasses, but she knocks him out of the window and down a hill and calls the police.

The next day, Nada returns to the alleyway and retrieves the sunglasses from a garbage truck before Frank meets Nada to give him his paycheck. Nada tries to get Frank to put on the glasses, but Frank thinks Nada is a murderer and wants nothing to do with him. Frank and Nada get into a long and violent brawl, after which Frank is too tired to prevent Nada from putting the sunglasses on him. After seeing the aliens and a flying saucer, Frank goes into hiding with Nada.

Frank and Nada run into Gilbert, who leads them to a meeting of the anti-alien movement. At the meeting, they are given contact lenses to replace the sunglasses, and learn that the aliens are using global warming to make Earth more like their own planet, and are depleting the Earth's resources for their own gain. They also learn that the aliens have been bribing humans to become collaborators, promoting them to positions of power. Holly arrives at the meeting, apologizing to Nada. The meeting is raided by police and the vast majority of those present are killed, with the survivors (including Frank, Nada, and Holly) scattering. Nada and Frank are cornered in an alley, but they accidentally activate an alien wristwatch, opening a portal through which they escape.

The portal takes them to the aliens' spaceport, where they discover a meeting of aliens and human collaborators celebrating the elimination of the "terrorists". They are approached by a former drifter they briefly met in the shantytown, now a collaborator, who gives them a tour of the facility. He leads them to the basement of Cable 54, the source of the signal, which is protected by armed guards. Nada and Frank find Holly and fight their way to the transmitter on the roof, but Holly kills Frank, revealing that she too is a human collaborator. Nada kills Holly and destroys the transmitter, and is fatally wounded by aliens in a helicopter. Nada gives the aliens the middle finger as he dies.

With the transmitter destroyed, humans all over the world are free from their dream-like state and discover the aliens hiding amongst them.

Cast
 Roddy Piper as Nada
 Keith David as Frank Armitage
 Meg Foster as Holly Thompson
 Raymond St. Jacques as Street Preacher
 George Buck Flower as Drifter / Collaborator
 Peter Jason as Gilbert
 Sy Richardson as Black Revolutionary
 Susan Blanchard as Ingenue
 Norman Alden as Construction Foreman
 Kerry Rossall as 2nd Unit Guard

Themes
Carpenter has said that the film's political commentary derives from his dissatisfaction with then-U.S. President Ronald Reagan's economic policies—also known as Reaganomics—and what Carpenter viewed as increasing commercialization in both the popular culture and politics of the era.

Upon the film's release, Carpenter remarked, "The picture's premise is that the 'Reagan Revolution' is run by aliens from another galaxy. Free enterprisers from outer space have taken over the world, and are exploiting Earth as if it's a third world planet. As soon as they exhaust all our resources, they'll move on to another world... I began watching TV again. I quickly realized that everything we see is designed to sell us something. ... It's all about wanting us to buy something. The only thing they want to do is take our money." To this end, Carpenter thought of sunglasses as being the tool to seeing the truth, which "is seen in black and white. It's as if the aliens have colonized us. That means, of course, that Ted Turner is really a monster from outer space." The director commented on the alien threat in an interview: "They want to own all our businesses. A Universal executive asked me, 'Where's the threat in that? We all sell out every day.' I ended up using that line in the film." The aliens were deliberately made to look like ghouls, according to Carpenter, who said "The creatures are corrupting us, so they, themselves, are corruptions of human beings."

In 2017, in response to neo-Nazi interpretations of the film's themes, Carpenter further clarified that the film "is about yuppies and unrestrained capitalism" and "has nothing to do with Jewish control of the world".

Production

Development
The idea for They Live came from a short story called "Eight O'Clock in the Morning" by Ray Nelson, originally published in The Magazine of Fantasy & Science Fiction in November 1963, involving an alien invasion in the tradition of Invasion of the Body Snatchers, which Nelson, along with artist Bill Wray, adapted into a story called "Nada" published in the Alien Encounters comics anthology in April 1986. John Carpenter describes Nelson's story as "... a D.O.A.-type of story, in which a man is put in a trance by a stage hypnotist. When he awakens, he realizes that the entire human race has been hypnotized, and that alien creatures are controlling humanity. He has only until eight o'clock in the morning to solve the problem." Carpenter acquired the film rights to both the comic book and short story and wrote the screenplay, using Nelson's story as a basis for the film's structure.

Because the screenplay was the product of so many sources—a short story, a comic book, and input from cast and crew—Carpenter decided to use the pseudonym "Frank Armitage", an allusion to one of the filmmaker's favorite writers, H. P. Lovecraft (Henry Armitage is a character in Lovecraft's The Dunwich Horror). Carpenter has always felt a close kinship with Lovecraft's worldview, and according to the director "Lovecraft wrote about the hidden world, the 'world underneath'. His stories were about gods who are repressed, who were once on Earth and are now coming back. The world underneath has a great deal to do with They Live."

Casting
For the role of Nada, the filmmaker cast professional wrestler Roddy Piper, whom he had met at WrestleMania III earlier in 1987. For Carpenter, it was an easy choice: "Unlike most Hollywood actors, Roddy has life written all over him." Carpenter was impressed with Keith David's performance in The Thing and needed someone "who wouldn't be a traditional sidekick but could hold his own." To this end, Carpenter wrote the role of Frank specifically for Keith David.

Filming
They Live was shot in eight weeks during March and April 1988, principally on location in downtown Los Angeles, with a budget only slightly greater than $3 million. One of the highlights of the film is a five-and-a-half-minute alley fight between Nada and Frank over a pair of the special sunglasses. Carpenter recalls that the fight took three weeks to rehearse: "It was an incredibly brutal and funny fight, along the lines of the slugfest between John Wayne and Victor McLaglen in The Quiet Man."

Music

Music for the film was composed by John Carpenter and Alan Howarth.

Release
They Live was theatrically released in North America on November 4, 1988, and debuted at #1 at the box office, grossing $4.8 million during its opening weekend. The film spent two weeks in the top ten. The film's original release date, advertised in promotional material as October 21, 1988, had been pushed back two weeks to avoid direct competition with Halloween 4: The Return of Michael Myers.

Reception
In his review for the Chicago Reader, Jonathan Rosenbaum wrote, "Carpenter's wit and storytelling craft make this fun and watchable, although the script takes a number of unfortunate shortcuts, and the possibilities inherent in the movie's central concept are explored only cursorily." Jay Carr, writing for The Boston Globe, said "[o]nce Carpenter delivers his throwback-to-the-'50s visuals, complete with plump little B-movie flying saucers, and makes his point that the rich are fascist fiends, They Live starts running low on imagination and inventiveness", but felt that "as sci-fi horror comedy, They Live, with its wake-up call to the world, is in a class with Terminator and RoboCop, even though its hero doesn't sport bionic biceps".

In her review for The New York Times, Janet Maslin wrote, "Since Mr. Carpenter seems to be trying to make a real point here, the flatness of They Live is doubly disappointing. So is its crazy inconsistency, since the film stops trying to abide even by its own game plan after a while." Richard Harrington wrote in The Washington Post, "it's just John Carpenter as usual, trying to dig deep with a toy shovel. The plot for They Live is full of black holes, the acting is wretched, the effects are second-rate. In fact, the whole thing is so preposterous it makes V look like Masterpiece Theatre." Rick Groen, in The Globe and Mail, wrote, "the movie never gets beyond the pop Orwell premise. The social commentary wipes clean with a dry towelette – it's not intrusive and not pedantic, just lighter-than-air."

On the review aggregator website Rotten Tomatoes, the film has an approval rating of 85% based on 68 reviews, and an average rating of 7.20/10. The website's critical consensus reads: "A politically subversive blend of horror and sci fi, They Live is an underrated genre film from John Carpenter." Metacritic gives the film a weighted average rating of 55 out of 100 based on 22 reviews, indicating "mixed or average reviews".

The 2012 documentary film The Pervert's Guide to Ideology, presented by the Slovene philosopher and psychoanalyst Slavoj Žižek, begins with an analysis of They Live. Žižek uses the film's concept of wearing special sunglasses that reveal truth to explain his definition of ideology. Žižek states:

Legacy
They Live was ranked #18 on Entertainment Weekly magazine's "The Cult 25: The Essential Left-Field Movie Hits Since '83" list in 2008.

Rotten Tomatoes ranked the fight scene between Roddy Piper's character, Nada, and Keith David's character, Frank Armitage, seventh on their list of "The 20 Greatest Fight Scenes Ever". The fight scene influenced The Wrestler, whose director, Darren Aronofsky, interpreted the scene as a spoof. The fight scene was parodied by the TV show South Park in the episode "Cripple Fight." Shepard Fairey credits the film as a major source of inspiration, sharing a similar logo to his "Andre the Giant Has a Posse" campaign. "They Live was…the basis for my use of the word 'obey'," Fairey said. "The movie has a very strong message about the power of commercialism and the way that people are manipulated by advertising."

Novelist Jonathan Lethem called They Live one of his "favorite movies of the eighties, hands down". He said, "It's a great movie...Look at what it does to people, look at how it emboldens and provokes...It's disturbing and ridiculous and outrageous and uncomfortable, but I think it's the kind of great movie that doesn't really need defense, it just needs to be given the air." Lethem wrote a book-length homage to the movie for the Soft Skull Press Deep Focus series.

The 2013 video game Saints Row IV features an extended parody of They Live, with Roddy Piper and Keith David voicing fictionalized versions of themselves in a recreation of the fight scene between Nada and Armitage.

Rock band Green Day paid homage to They Live in their music video for "Back in the USA" from the album Greatest Hits: God's Favorite Band. Similarly, punk band Anti-Flag used the film as inspiration for their 2020 music video, "The Disease". David Banner and 9th Wonder also used the film as the influence behind their 2010 video for "Slow Down".

Minnesota-based alternative hip-hop artist P.O.S. used scenes from the film interspersed with clips of himself for the song, "Roddy Piper" off his 2017 album, Chill, Dummy.

In July 2018, the film was selected to be screened in the Venice Classics section at the 75th Venice International Film Festival.

The film is noted for a popularly quoted line spoken by Nada: "I have come here to chew bubblegum and kick ass. And I'm all out of bubblegum."

Home media
They Live was released on VHS by MCA Home Video in 1989. It was later released on DVD by Universal Home Entertainment on October 17, 2000.

On March 2, 2012, the film was released on Blu-ray by StudioCanal. On November 6, 2012, Shout! Factory released a "Collector's Edition" of the film on both DVD and Blu-ray.

In 2014, Universal Pictures released They Live on DVD along with The Thing, Village of the Damned, and Virus as part of the 4 Movie Midnight Marathon Pack: Aliens.

On January 19, 2021, Shout! Factory released the "Collector's Edition" of the film on 4K Ultra HD Blu-ray.

Awards and honors

Proposed remake
In 2010, there was development on a remake of the film, with Carpenter in a producing role. In 2011, Matt Reeves signed on to direct and write the screenplay. The project also shifted away from being a remake of They Live to a re-adaptation of "8 O'Clock in the Morning", ditching the satirical and political elements. Since then, there have been no new announcements.

A 2016 serial with a similar argument about insects controlling the Capitol is BrainDead.

Notes

References

Further reading

External links

 They Live at John Carpenter's official movie site
 
 
 
 
 

1988 films
1988 action films
1988 science fiction films
1980s American films
1980s dystopian films
1980s English-language films
1980s satirical films
1980s science fiction action films
American dystopian films
American satirical films
American science fiction action films
Anti-capitalism
Carolco Pictures films
Films about consumerism
Films about extraterrestrial life
Films about poverty
Films based on American short stories
Films based on science fiction short stories
Films directed by John Carpenter
Films scored by John Carpenter
Films scored by Alan Howarth (composer)
Films set in Los Angeles
Films shot in Los Angeles
Films with screenplays by John Carpenter
Squatting in film
Universal Pictures films